Hulick is a surname. Notable people with the surname include:

Douglas Hulick, American writer
George W. Hulick (1833–1907), American lawyer, judge and politician